Viguí  is a corregimiento in Las Palmas District, Veraguas Province, Panama with a population of 964 as of 2010. It was created by Law 10 of March 7, 1997; this measure was complemented by Law 5 of January 19, 1998 and Law 69 of October 28, 1998. Its population as of 2000 was 929.

References

Corregimientos of Veraguas Province